Pollia macrophylla is a perennial herb found in rainforest in eastern Australia.

References

Commelinaceae
Flora of Queensland
Flora of New South Wales